Sermyla riqueti is a species of brackish water and freshwater snail with an operculum, an aquatic gastropod mollusk in the family Thiaridae.

Ecology
The pollution tolerance value is 3 (on scale 0–10; 0 is the best water quality, 10 is the worst water quality).

References

 Martin, K. (1879-1880). Die Tertiärschichten auf Java, nach den Entdeckungen von Fr. Junghuhn. Leiden: Brill.
 Brandt, R. A. M. (1974). The non-marine aquatic Mollusca of Thailand. Archiv für Molluskenkunde. 105: i-iv, 1-423.

External links
 Grateloup, J.-P. S. (1840). Description de plusieurs coquilles nouvelles ou peu connues de mollusques exotiques vivants. Actes de la Société Linnéenne de Bordeaux. 11: 394-455
 Lea, I.; Lea, H. C. (1851). Description of a new genus of the family Melaniana, and of many new species of the genus Melania, chiefly collected by Hugh Cuming, Esq., during his zoological voyage in the East , and now first described. Proceedings of the Zoological Society of London. 18: 179-197
 Souleyet, L. F. A. (1852). Tome Deuxième. Mollusques. In: Eydoux, F.; Souleyet, L. F. A. (1841-1852). Voyage autour du monde exécuté pendant les années 1836 et 1837 sur la corvette La Bonite. Zoologie. 664 pp., 101 pls (plates published 1841, but without Latin species names). Arthus Bertrand, Paris
 Chen, S.-F. (Sui-Fong). (1943). Two new genera, two new species, and two new names of Chinese Melaniidae. Nautilus. 57: 19-21.
 Philippi, R. A. (1842-1850). Abbildungen und Beschreibungen neuer oder wenig gekannter Conchylien unter Mithülfe mehrerer deutscher Conchyliologen. Cassel, T. Fischer
 Glaubrecht M., Brinkmann N. & Pöppe J. (2009). Diversity and disparity ‘down under': Systematics, biogeography and reproductive modes of the ‘marsupial' freshwater Thiaridae (Caenogastropoda, Cerithioidea) in Australia. Zoosystematics and Evolution. 85(2): 199-275
 Lentge-Maaß N., Neiber M.T., Gimnich F. & Glaubrecht M. (2021 (nomenclatural availability: 2020)). Evolutionary systematics of the viviparous gastropod Sermyla (Gastropoda: Cerithioidea: Thiaridae), with the description of a new species. Zoological Journal of the Linnean Society. 192: 736-762

Thiaridae
Gastropods described in 1840
Freshwater molluscs of Oceania